Pesadilla para un rico is a 1996 Spanish film directed by Fernando Fernán Gómez and written by Luis Alcoriza.

External links
 

1996 films
Spanish comedy films
1990s Spanish-language films
Films directed by Fernando Fernán Gómez
1990s Spanish films